Manpagale is a village in Kalewa Township, Kale District, in the Sagaing Region of western Burma. It lies on the left bank of the Chindwin River.

See also
Townships of Burma

References

External links
Maplandia World Gazetteer

Populated places in Kale District
Kalewa Township